West Lancashire is a local government district with borough status in Lancashire, England. The council is based in Ormskirk, and the largest town in the borough is Skelmersdale. At the 2011 Census, the population of the borough was 110,685.

History
The district was created on 1 April 1974 under the Local Government Act 1972, as a non-metropolitan district, with Lancashire County Council as the higher tier authority providing county-level services. West Lancashire covered the whole territory of two former districts and parts of another two districts, all of which were abolished at the same time:
Ormskirk Urban District
Skelmersdale and Holland Urban District
West Lancashire Rural District (majority of former district's territory; remainder went to Merseyside)
Wigan Rural District (parishes of Dalton, Parbold and Wrightington; remainder went to Greater Manchester)

In 2009 the district was awarded borough status, causing the council to change its name from West Lancashire District Council to West Lancashire Borough Council, and allowing the chairman of the council to take the title of mayor.

Proposals to divide Lancashire into three unitary authorities were put forward in 2020, which would have seen both Lancashire County Council and West Lancashire Borough Council abolished. The Government did not pursue that proposed reform, although left open the possibility of other forms of reorganisation in future.

Governance

West Lancashire Borough Council has been under no overall control since May 2021, with the Labour Party as the largest party. The leader of the council since May 2022 has been Yyvonne Gagen of the Labour Party.

The council employs around 600 people, making it one of West Lancashire's largest employers. It is responsible for the administration of various services, such as leisure, waste collection, planning permission and pest control.

There are two localist political parties operating in West Lancashire: Our West Lancashire, which holds seven seats on West Lancashire Borough Council and has contested elections on Lancashire County Council, and Skelmersdale Independent Party, which does not hold any seats on West Lancashire but has contested elections.

Premises
The council is based at 52 Derby Street in Ormskirk, which was originally a pair of large semi-detached Victorian houses called Beaconsfield (number 52) and Abbotsford (number 54). Beaconsfield was purchased in 1925 by West Lancashire Rural District Council, one of the modern council's predecessors, and converted to become its headquarters, being formally opened on 30 July 1925. Abbotsford was acquired later and the building has been significantly extended to the rear.

List of councillors 
Since the last election in May 2022, the councillors have been as follows. The next election is due in 2023.

Parliamentary constituencies
The south of West Lancashire, including the towns of Burscough, Skelmersdale and Ormskirk fall under the West Lancashire constituency in the House of Commons, which has been represented by Labour Party MP Ashley Dalton since the 2023 West Lancashire by-election, whereas the north of West Lancashire falls under the South Ribble constituency, which has been represented by Conservative Party MP Katherine Fletcher since the 2019 general election.

Geography
Skelmersdale, a former New Town, and Ormskirk are the two main towns in the borough. These are surrounded by a patchwork of smaller settlements to the west and north.

Civil parishes
There are 22 civil parishes in West Lancashire, although the main towns of Skelmersdale and Ormskirk are unparished areas. There is a movement to establish a town council in Skelmersdale.

All the civil parishes have a parish council, with the exception of Bispham, which has a parish meeting instead.

Twin towns
West Lancashire is twinned with:

References 

 
Non-metropolitan districts of Lancashire
Boroughs in England